Soul Kicking is a 2006 Greek drama film directed by Yannis Economides.

Cast 
 Errikos Litsis - Takis
 Vangelis Mourikis - Periklis
 Maria Kehayioglou - Eirini
 Giannis Voulgarakis - Giorgos
 Maria Nafpliotou - Popi
 Costas Xikominos - Tzimis

References

External links 

2006 drama films
2006 films
Greek drama films